Behind the Stockade is a 1911 short film drama co-directed by Thomas H. Ince and George Loane Tucker. It starred real-life married couple Mary Pickford and Owen Moore.

Only a shortened version of this film survives. It is part of RKO's Flicker Flashbacks (Series 5 No. 1) from 1947.

Cast
Mary Pickford - Florence Williams
Owen Moore - Billy Thompson

References

External links
Behind the Stockade at IMDb.com

1911 films
American silent short films
American black-and-white films
Films directed by Thomas H. Ince
Films directed by George Loane Tucker
1911 short films
1911 drama films
Silent American drama films
1910s American films
American drama short films